Charles George Rothwell ( – 28 January 1917) was an Australian rugby league footballer who played in the New South Wales Rugby League for Western Suburbs.

Early life and rugby career
Rothwell was born  in Alexandria to John Thomas and Mary Ann Rothwell. Rothwell appeared for Western Suburbs between 1912 and 1914, playing 7 times, scoring 3 tries, and gaining 9 points.

Personal life and military career
Rothwell worked as a clerk. On 3 June 1915, ten months after the outbreak of the First World War, he enlisted in the First Australian Imperial Force and was assigned as a private with the 18th Battalion. Wounded twice within the year, Rothwell was promoted to corporal on 13 October 1916, attaining the rank of sergeant within a month and a half. Rothwell was accidentally wounded whilst practicing with grenades on 27 January 1917 and was evacuated to the 45th Casualty Clearing Station in Dernancourt, where he died of wounds the following day. Rothwell was buried at the Dernancourt Communal Cemetery Extension.

Career statistics

References

1894 births
1917 deaths
Date of birth missing
Rugby league players from Sydney
Rugby league wingers
Western Suburbs Magpies players
Australian Army soldiers
Australian military personnel killed in World War I
Deaths by hand grenade
Accidental deaths in France